Frederick Ungar Publishing Company was a New York publishing firm which was founded in 1940.

History 
The Frederick Ungar Publishing Company published over 2,000 titles, including reference books such as the Encyclopedia of World Literature in the 20th Century and many works on literature and cinema.  The more than 200 translations published by the firm of works by such authors as Thomas Mann, including his Betrachtungen eines Unpolitischen (1918) (translated as Reflections of a Nonpolitical Man), Erich Fromm and Goethe helped make those works more popular in the United States.

The company was acquired by Continuum Publishing Company in 1985.

Frederick "Fritz" Ungar
Frederick "Fritz" Ungar (born Friedrich Ungar) worked as a publisher from 1922 and co-founded the publishing houses Phaidon Verlag (later Phaidon Press) and Saturn Verlag in Vienna. With the Nazis coming to power in his country, he left Austria for New York in 1939 and founded the Frederick Ungar Publishing Company there in 1940.  He died in 1988.(18 November 1988). Frederick Ungar, 90, Founder of Publishing House, The New York Times

Book series
 American Classics
 Atlantic Paperbacks
 College Translations
 A Library of Literary Criticism
 Literature and Life: American Writers
 Literature and Life: British Writers
 Literature and Life: Mystery Writers
 The Literatures of the World in English Translation: A Bibliography
 Medical Viewpoint Series
 Milestones of Thought [Milestones of Thought in the History of Ideas]
 Modern Film Scripts
 Modern Literature Monographs
 Renaissance Text Series
 RKO Classic Screenplays
 Ungar Film Library
 Ungar Writers' Recognitions Series
 World Dramatists

External links
 Frederick Ungar Papers, 1931-1989 at M. E. Grenander Department of Special Collections & Archives, State University of New York
 Frederick Ungar Publishing Co. at Database – Jewish Publishers of German Literature in Exile, 1933-1945

References

Publishing companies established in 1940
Book publishing companies based in New York (state)
American companies established in 1940